Charlton Mashumba (born 12 December 1992) is a Zimbabwean professional footballer, currently playing for Polokwane City in the South African Premier Division.

Career
Mashumba signed for Jomo Cosmos F.C. and in his first season helped them get promoted from the 2014–15 National First Division after finishing 2nd in which Mashumba scored 17 goals. Following this it was thought that Mashumba would leave the club, as his goalscoring efforts had attracted attention from other Premier League Soccer clubs, as well as those abroad. This was confirmed when Mushumba went for trials in Portugal with C.D. Tondela in the Primeira Liga in which he scored a goal in a friendly against U.D. Oliveirense. Mashumba also held trials in Switzerland These trials proved ultimately unsuccessful, and he rejoined Jomo Cosmos, signing a 2-year contract.

International career
Mashumba has represented Zimbabwe at international youth level, playing five times for the U17s, and twice for the U20s.

References

External links
 
 Charlton Mashumba Jomo Cosmos FC profile
 

1992 births
Association football forwards
Living people
Jomo Cosmos F.C. players
Zimbabwean footballers
Zimbabwean expatriate footballers
Zimbabwean expatriate sportspeople in South Africa
Expatriate soccer players in South Africa
Zimbabwe international footballers